Eric Taylor (born December 14, 1981) is a Canadian football defensive tackle for the Calgary Stampeders of the Canadian Football League. He was drafted by the Pittsburgh Steelers in the seventh round of the 2004 NFL Draft. He played college football at Memphis.

In the NFL, Taylor has played for the Minnesota Vikings, Seattle Seahawks, and Tennessee Titans.

CFL career

Edmonton Eskimos
Taylor played his first two seasons in the CFL for the Edmonton Eskimos. He only played the last 5 weeks of the 2008 CFL season but still amassed 16 tackles and 1 sack. He also recovered his first and only fumble of his career on October 10, 2008. In his second year in the CFL Taylor collected 28 tackles and 2 sacks in 13 games played.

Toronto Argonauts
On February 10, 2010, Taylor was traded to the Toronto Argonauts from the Eskimos in exchange for receivers Andre Talbot and Brad Smith. In the 2010 CFL season Taylor once again played in 13 games, this time only recording 17 tackles, but 3 sacks, a career high at the time.

BC Lions
He signed with the BC Lions through free agency on February 16, 2011. In his first season with the Lions Taylor saw limited playing time. He only played in 7 games, but still managed to collect 21 tackles and 3 sacks. Taylor had a strong 2012 CFL season, he played in 15 of the 18 games, recorded 21 tackles and a career-best four sacks. On April 24, 2013, Taylor signed a contract extension with the BC Lions. Taylor played in 57 regular season games while amassing 107 tackles and 13 sacks over four years. He was released on March 2, 2015.

Calgary Stampeders
Taylor signed with the Calgary Stampeders on March 6, 2015.

References

External links
Calgary Stampeders bio 
BC Lions bio

1981 births
Living people
People from Winchester, Tennessee
American football defensive tackles
American football defensive ends
Canadian football defensive linemen
Memphis Tigers football players
Pittsburgh Steelers players
Minnesota Vikings players
Seattle Seahawks players
Tennessee Titans players
Edmonton Elks players
Toronto Argonauts players
BC Lions players
Calgary Stampeders players